Bruce Charles Armstrong (born September 7, 1965) is an American former football player who was an offensive tackle in the National Football League (NFL) from 1987 to 2000, playing all 14 seasons with the New England Patriots.  He was drafted in the first round (23rd overall) in the 1987 draft out of University of Louisville, where he was a four-year varsity athlete and was named the "Most Outstanding  Lineman" following his senior season.

He was elected to play in six Pro Bowls, in 1990, 1991, 1994, 1995, 1996, 1997.  The only offensive linemen to play in more Pro Bowls as a Patriot are Hall-of-Famer John Hannah and Jon Morris. Armstrong is one of only 29 Patriots to have been inducted into the Patriots Hall of Fame and one of only seven players to have his number retired.  Of 220 possible non-strike games, Armstrong started in 212 (including the last 118 of his career consecutively), which until 2015, made him the single player with the most starts of any Patriot.  The only games he missed were in the second half of the 1992, after tearing the medial collateral ligament and both his anterior and posterior cruciate ligaments in his right knee against the Buffalo Bills in November of that year.  Though it was feared that the injury would be a career-ending one, Armstrong rebounded and was back the next season.

Armstrong and his wife, Melinda Yvette Armstrong, recently bought and now operate a salon in Alpharetta, Georgia. They have two children: Candace and Nicholas.

References

External links
 New England Patriots bio

American football offensive tackles
1965 births
Living people
New England Patriots players
American Conference Pro Bowl players
Louisville Cardinals football players
National Football League players with retired numbers
Ed Block Courage Award recipients